Asher Brauner (October 25, 1946 – January 2, 2021) was an American actor.

Brauner appeared in the 1975 action film, Switchblade Sisters, directed by Jack Hill, and his other film credits include roles in Two-Minute Warning (1976), The Boss' Son (1978), Where the Boys Are '84 (1984), Escape from El Diablo (1984), Treasure of the Moon Goddess (1987), Merchants of War (1989) and American Eagle (1989). He also appeared opposite Wings Hauser in the 1990 films Coldfire and Living to Die. He had numerous television acting credits including General Hospital, Ironside, Kojak and Harry O, and TV movies such as Alexander: The Other Side of Dawn (1977) and Young Joe, the Forgotten Kennedy (1977).

Brauner died on January 2, 2021, at the age of 74.

Filmography

Film

Television

References

1946 births
2021 deaths
American male film actors
American male television actors
Male actors from Chicago